Mirjana Lučić-Baroni was the defending champion, but lost in the semifinals to Annika Beck.

Beck went on to win the title, defeating Jeļena Ostapenko 6–2, 6–2 in the final.

Seeds

Draw

Finals

Top half

Bottom half

Qualifying

Seeds

Qualifiers

Lucky losers

Qualifying draw

First qualifier

Second qualifier

Third qualifier

Fourth qualifier

Fifth qualifier

Sixth qualifier

References
Main Draw
Qualifying Draw

Coupe Banque Nationale
Tournoi de Québec
Can